Back to Baghdad is a 1996 combat flight simulator video game developed and published by Military Simulations.

Gameplay
Back to Baghdad is a combat flight simulator: its gameplay involves piloting a realistic reproduction of the F-16 fighter jet.

Reception

Writing for PC Games, Peter Olafson gave Back to Baghdad a largely negative review. He concluded, "I do like a good flight sim, but here, again and again, I felt lost in a world that offered small rewards for hard work." Mike Stassus of Computer Game Review was more positive: he called the game "a pretty good entry for serious flight sim fans" despite its flaws. Computer Games Strategy Plus offered yet a better review, with Steve Wartofsky dubbing Back to Baghdad "the first real contender for the serious simulation crown we've seen since SSI's release of Su-27".

References

External links

1996 video games
Combat flight simulators
Commodore CDTV games
DOS games
Video games developed in the United States
Video games set in Iraq